The Mostiștea is a left tributary of the river Danube in Romania. It flows through the artificial Lake Mostiștea. Its source is near the village Dascălu, northeast of Bucharest. It flows into the Danube near Mânăstirea.

The river (and its tributaries) is formed mainly by lakes (bălți in Romanian), because of human intervention, that flow one into another, until they reach Mânăstirea. There, it forms the largest lake on the river, lake Mostiștea, and it is dammed. After the dam, the river flows towards the Danube artificially channeled, for about 10 km (6 miles), through Canalul Dorobanțu (Dorobanțu Channel).

Towns and villages

The following towns and villages are situated along the river Mostiștea, from source to mouth: Dascălu, Petrăchioaia, Sineşti, Belciugatele, Fundulea, Tămădău Mare, Sărulești, Gurbănești, Valea Argovei, Frăsinet, Mânăstirea.

Tributaries

The following rivers are tributaries to the river Mostiștea (from source to mouth):

Left: Valea Livezilor, Colceag, Vânăta, Argova

Right: Belciugatele, Corâta

References

Rivers of Romania
Rivers of Călărași County
Rivers of Ialomița County
Rivers of Ilfov County